Hatha Kapuralalage Karunaratne (21 October 1941 – August 1983) was a Sri Lankan boxer. He competed in the men's light flyweight event at the 1968 Summer Olympics.

References

External links
 

1941 births
1983 deaths
Sri Lankan male boxers
Olympic boxers of Sri Lanka
Boxers at the 1968 Summer Olympics
Light-flyweight boxers
People from Sabaragamuwa Province